The St. James Church in St James, Cape Town, South Africa, is a large church whose building was built circa 1900.

References

Churches completed in 1900
Churches in Cape Town
20th-century religious buildings and structures in South Africa